is an animated series broadcast between October 5, 1998, and April 2, 1999, on NHK in Japan. It was a co-production primarily with Southern Star of Australia, and secondarily with NHK (Japan Broadcasting Corporation), Think Tank Productions, and Shanghai Yilimie Animation Co. of China.

Main characters

Japanese version 
 Kappei Yamaguchi — Pickles-Chef Goulash's Assident
 Kōsuke Komori — Scampi (Pesto)-The Waiter
 Mami Koyama — Madame Courgette-The Owner of Cafe Courgette
 Kōsei Tomita — Chef Goulash-The Chef
 Taeko Shinbashi — Mrs. Borscht
 Mayu Fujimori — Spagette

English version 
 Kate Fitzpatrick as Madame Courgette
Doug Scroope as Chef Goulash

Episodes

External links 
 

1998 anime television series debuts
1990s Australian animated television series
1998 Japanese television series debuts
1999 Japanese television series endings
1998 Australian television series debuts
1999 Australian television series endings
Australian children's animated television series
Japanese children's animated television series
NHK original programming
Television series by Endemol Australia
Animated television series about cats